Pushkardhoj Shahi (born 1959) is a Nepalese boxer. He competed in the men's bantamweight (54 kg) event at the 1980 Summer Olympics.  He won gold medals in 1984 South Asian Games.

References

1959 births
Living people
Nepalese male boxers
Olympic boxers of Nepal
Boxers at the 1980 Summer Olympics
Place of birth missing (living people)